Kathleen Lloyd (also credited as Kathleen Gackle) is an American actress known for her role as the female lead in The Missouri Breaks (1976), opposite Marlon Brando and Jack Nicholson. She also appeared in the horror films The Car (1977) and It Lives Again (1978).

Early years
Lloyd is the daughter of a poultry farmer from Santa Maria, California. She had also been a musician, and her mother had been a flamenco dancer. She left the University of California, Los Angeles to venture into acting after winning a Hugh O'Brian Acting Award.

Career
Lloyd made more than eighty screen appearances between 1970 and 2003, almost all in television series, including a recurring role as Assistant District Attorney Carol Baldwin on Magnum, P.I. from 1983 to 1988. She also had recurring roles on The Gangster Chronicles as Stella Siegel, and Hill Street Blues as Nurse Linda Wulfawitz.

In the early-to-mid-1970s, Lloyd was billed sometimes as Kathy Lloyd and sometimes as Kathleen Gackle.

Filmography
Room 222 (TV series, 1970, season 1 episode 23, "I Love You Charlie, I Love You Abbie") as Abbie
Bearcats! (1971, episode 1, "The Devil Wears Armor") as Sister Catalina
Adam-12 (TV series, 1972, episode: “The Wednesday Warrior”) as Tawnia Baker
The Sixth Sense (TV series, 1972, episode: "The Eyes That Wouldn't Die") as Kathy Turner
Ironside (TV series, 1972, episode: "His Fiddlers Three") as Diane Lombard
Ironside (TV series, 1973, episode: "The Best Laid Plans") as Bank Teller
Incident on a Dark Street (1973, TV movie)
Kung Fu (Tv series, 1973, episode: “Blood Brother”)
Such Dust as Dreams Are Made On (1973, pilot movie for Harry O) 
Emergency! (1972, episode: "Musical Mania")
 Harry O (1975, episode: "Silent Kill")
Sorority Kill (1974, TV movie)
 Medical Center (TV series) (1974, episode: "Saturday's Child")
The Missouri Breaks (1976) as Jane Braxton
The Car (1977)
Skateboard (1978)
It Lives Again (1978)
Lacy and the Mississippi Queen (1978, TV movie)
Hart to Hart (1979, episode: "You Made Me Kill You" Sea 1 Ep 5) as Peggy
High Midnight (1979, TV movie)
Take Down (1979)
Make Me an Offer (1980, TV movie)
The White Shadow (1980, episode: "Gonna Fly Now") as Paula
The Incredible Hulk (1980, episode: "On the Line") as Randy Phelps
The Jayne Mansfield Story (1980, TV movie)
The Choice (1981, TV movie)
The Gangster Chronicles (1981, miniseries) as Stella Siegel 
Strike Force (1981, episode: "The Predator") as Lucy Durrant 
Magnum, P.I. (1982-1988, TV series, 21 episodes)
Shooting Stars (1983, TV movie)
 Cagney & Lacey (1983, TV series episode: "Date Rape")
Airwolf (1984, TV series) (Episode "To Snare a Wolf") as Antonia Donatelli
Obsessed with a Married Woman (1985, TV movie)
Sins of the Father (1985, TV movie)
Murder, She Wrote (1986, episode: "Obituary for a Dead Anchor") as Paula Roman
Stingray (1986, Season 1, Episode 6: "Sometimes You Gotta Sing The Blues") as Candice
Best Seller (1987)
The Man with Three Wives (1993, TV movie)
Babylon 5 (1997, episode: "The Deconstruction of Falling Stars") as Elizabeth Metarie
Diagnosis: Murder (1999), episode: "Gangland" as Emma Bornstein
One Last Flight (1999)

References

External links

American film actresses
American television actresses
Living people
Actresses from the San Francisco Bay Area
People from Santa Clara, California
20th-century American actresses
21st-century American actresses
Year of birth missing (living people)